Year 1008 (MVIII) was a leap year starting on Thursday (link will display the full calendar) of the Julian calendar.

Events 
 By place 

 Europe 
 Olaf Haraldsson, future king of Norway, makes raids in the Baltic Sea. He lands on the Estonian island of Saaremaa, wins a battle there, and forces the inhabitants to pay tribute. 
 Battle at Herdaler: Olaf Haraldsson sails to the southern coast of Finland to plunder, where he and his men are ambushed and defeated in the woods.
 Bagrat III adds more lands to his realm, and becomes the first ruler of the Kingdom of Georgia (until 1014).
 The oldest known mention is made of the city of Gundelfingen (Southern Germany).
 Abkhazia and Iberia are unified into the Kingdom of Georgia.

 England 
 King Æthelred the Unready orders a new fleet of warships built, organised on a national scale. It is a huge undertaking, but is completed the following year.

 Arabian Empire 
 Caliph Al-Hakim bi-Amr Allah sends a tributary mission to Emperor Zhenzong of the Song dynasty in order to reestablish trade relations between the Fatimid Caliphate and China (approximate date).

 Japan 
 November 13 – Kamo Special Festival: The poet Murasaki Shikibu is given her name from a famous court poet, Fujiwara no Kinto; this year she probably starts to write The Diary of Lady Murasaki.
 42nd Birthday of Fujiwara no Michinaga, father-in-law of the emperor, is celebrated.

 By topic 

 Religion 
 Autumn – Bruno of Querfurt, a missionary bishop, and 18 companions sets out on a mission to spread Christianity among the Prussians.
 Olof Skötkonung, king of Sweden, is baptized in Husaby (Västergötland) by missionary Sigfrid, and makes generous donations on the spot.

Births 
 May 4 – Henry I, king of France (d. 1060)
 October 12 – Atsuhira, future Emperor Go-Ichijō of Japan (d. 1036)
 Al-Mu'izz ibn Badis, Zirid ruler of Ifriqiya (d. 1062)
 Anselm of Liège, French chronicler and historian
 Di Qing, general of the Song Dynasty (d. 1057)
 Gothelo II (or Gozelo), duke of Lower Lorraine (d. 1046)
 Sugawara no Takasue, Japanese writer (approximate date)
 Wulfstan, bishop of Worcester (approximate date)

Deaths 
 March 17 – Kazan, emperor of Japan (b. 968)
 April 7 – Ludolf (or Liudolf), archbishop of Trier
 April 10 – Notker of Liège, French bishop (b. 940)
 May 25
 Bishi, Japanese imperial princess 
 Matilda of Saxony, countess of Flanders
 October 6 – Menendo González, Galician nobleman
 November 20 – Geoffrey I, duke of Brittany (b. 980)
 Abd al-Malik al-Muzaffar, Andalusian court official
 Clothna mac Aenghusa, Irish poet (approximate date)
 Gunnlaugr Ormstunga, Icelandic poet (approximate date)
 Gurgen II (Magistros), king of Iberia-Kartli (Georgia)
 Ibn Zur'a, Abbasid physician and philosopher (b. 943)
 Madudan mac Gadhra Mór, king of Síol Anmchadha
 Poppo, Polish missionary bishop (approximate date)
 Raymond III, French nobleman (approximate date)
 Rotbold I (or Rotbaud), French nobleman 
 Sarolt, Grand Princess of Hungary (b. 950)

References